The 1999 WNBA season was the 3rd for the Utah Starzz. The Starzz finished last in the West, despite improving to a 15-17 mark. The team started with coach Frank Layden, who resigned after a 2-2 record so he could retire.

Offseason

WNBA Draft

Regular season

Season standings

Season schedule

Player stats

References

External links
Starzz on Basketball Reference

Utah Starzz seasons
Utah
Utah Starzz